Frączki  is a village in the administrative district of Gmina Dywity, within Olsztyn County, Warmian-Masurian Voivodeship, in northern Poland. It is located in Warmia.

Before 1772 the area was part of Kingdom of Poland, 1772–1871 Prussia, 1871–1945 Germany, and again Poland since 1945.

The historic church of St. Mary Magdalene and five typical Warmian old wayside shrines are located in Frączki.

References

Villages in Olsztyn County